Aylin Yaren (born 30 August 1989 in Berlin, Germany) is a Turkish-German female midfielder, who currently plays for 	Türkiyemspor Berlin in Germany.

Early life
Yaren was born in Berlin, and grew up in Wedding and Reinickendorf. Her first football club was BFC Meteor 06. At school, she completed the Realschulabschluss.

Playing career

Club

Aylin played in 2009 at the Swedish Damallsvenskan for LdB Malmö before she returned to Germany to join TeBe Berlin. She transferred from 1. FC Lübars to Hamburger SV at the beginning of 2012, and scored the opening goal in her debut against 1. FFC Turbine Potsdam.

In February 2016, Yaren moved to Turkey to play for Trabzon İdmanocağı in the Turkish First League.

In the 2016–17 season, she returned home, and joined DSC Arminia Bielefeld to play in the 2. Bundesliga Nord. After sustaining an injury, she had to take a break upon advise of her physician.

International
Yaren made her debut for the Turkey women's national football team in a friendly match against Macedonia on 22 January 2006. She played in the Germany youth national and Turkey U-17 national, Turkey U-19 national teams.

In media and freestyle football shows
In 2007, she took part in the television show "Torwandschießen" (literally: goal wall shooting) of the German channel ZDF, where she won a type of penalty shootout with 4–3 against FC Bayern Munich's newly transferred French footballer Frank Ribery.

Aylin Yaren is practicing freestyle football by performing the art of self-expression with a football and exhibiting various tricks with her body. She learnt the art from videos on the internet, and she is training three to four hours a day.

She participated from 2010 to 2012 as contestant at episodes of the Turkey's Got Talent television show Yetenek Sizsiniz Türkiye demonstrating her art of freestyle football. In 2019, she participated at the German TV talent show Das Supertalent showing her football skills there.  

Yaren was one of the two players, the other being Julia Simic, who gave freestyle football performances in the roadshow for the 2010 FIFA U-20 Women's World Cup. At the actions during the 2011 FIFA Women's World Cup held in Germany, she was invited to perform freestyle football shows again. In 2011, she gave between 50 and 60 performances.

She appears with her shows also at company events and Bundesliga stadiums in Berlin.

In an interview in 2011, she said that she have deliberately not played qualifying games for Turkey for many years in order to keep the possibility open of playing for the German national team. However, she did not receive a nomination by the German national coach. She played her first European Championship qualifying match for Turkey in 2015, whereby she ultimately become long-term bound by the Turkish football association.

See also
 Freestyle football
 World Freestyle Football Association

References

External links

Living people
1989 births
German people of Turkish descent
German women's footballers
Expatriate women's footballers in Germany
Turkish women's footballers
Expatriate women's footballers in Sweden
Turkish expatriate sportspeople in Sweden
Footballers from Berlin
Turkey women's international footballers
FC Rosengård players
Tennis Borussia Berlin players
Hamburger SV (women) players
SC 07 Bad Neuenahr players
1. FC Lübars players
Trabzon İdmanocağı women's players
Freestyle footballers
Turkey's Got Talent contestants
2. Frauen-Bundesliga players
Women's association football midfielders
Damallsvenskan players